Meganola spodia, commonly known as the ashy meganola or Franclemont's meganola moth, is a species of nolid moth in the family Nolidae. It is found in North America.

The MONA or Hodges number for Meganola spodia is 8983.2.

References

Further reading

 
 
 

Nolinae
Articles created by Qbugbot
Moths described in 1985